Catherine Ringen is an American phonologist and professor emerita of linguistics at the University of Iowa. She is best known for her research on vowel harmony, especially in Finno-Ugric languages, and on laryngeal contrasts in obstruents, in particular in Germanic languages.

Ringen earned her Ph.D. in Linguistics from Indiana University in 1975, with a dissertation entitled "Vowel Harmony: Theoretical Implications." After her PhD she took up a position at the University of Iowa Linguistics Department, where she stayed until her retirement in 2015.

Ringen was co-editor of the Nordic Journal of Linguistics from 2001–2015. She served on the Executive Committee of the Linguistic Society of America from 2008–2010. She was a member of the scientific committee of the Manchester Phonology Meeting from 2004 to 2014.

Key publications 

Helgason, Pétur, and Catherine O. Ringen. 2008. Voicing and aspiration in Swedish stops. Journal of Phonetics 36, 607–628.

Jessen, Michael and Catherine O. Ringen. 2002. Laryngeal features in German. Phonology 19, 189–218.

Ringen, Catherine O. and Orvokki Heinämäki. 1999. Variation in Finnish Vowel Harmony: An OT Account. Natural Language and Linguistic Theory 17, 303–337.

Ringen, Catherine O. and Miklós Kontra. 1989. Hungarian neutral vowels. Lingua 78, 181–191.

Ringen, Catherine O. and Robert M. Vago. 1998. Hungarian vowel harmony in Optimality Theory. Phonology 15, 393–416.

References 

Linguists from the United States
Living people
Women linguists
Indiana University alumni
University of Iowa faculty
Phonologists
1943 births